Wendy Warburton (born January 17, 1976) is a Republican member of the Montana Legislature.  She was elected to House District 34 which represents the Havre, Montana area.

References

Living people
1976 births
Republican Party members of the Montana House of Representatives
Women state legislators in Montana
People from Havre, Montana
People from Phillips County, Montana
21st-century American women